Harold Cornelius Gosnell (July 17, 1908 - July 18, 1999) was the fifth Bishop of West Texas in The Episcopal Church, serving from December 31, 1968 until March 1, 1977.

Early life and education
Gosnell was born in Syracuse, New York on July 17, 1908 to Cornelius Parsons Gosnell and Carrie Fawcett. He was educated at the Syracuse High School and later studied at Syracuse University and graduated with a Bachelor of Arts in 1930. He then completed training for the priesthood at the Episcopal Theological Seminary in Cambridge, Massachusetts, earning a Bachelor of Divinity in 1933. He was awarded an honorary Doctor of Divinity from the University of the South in 1956. He married Marjorie O. Adams on August 29, 1932 and together had two children.

Career
Gosnell was ordained deacon in April 1933 and priest in November 1933 by Bishop Charles Fiske of Central New York. He served as rector of St John's Church in Marcellus, New York between 1933 and 1936 and then as rector of All Saints' Church in Fulton, New York from 1936 until 1938. He then became rector of Holy Trinity Church in Lincoln, Nebraska and remained there until 1948 when he was appointed rector of St Mark's Church in San Antonio and remained there for 20 years. During World War II]], Gosnell enlisted as a Navy chaplain and served two years in the South Pacific. He remained an active officer in the Naval Reserve until his retirement as captain on July 31, 1968.

Episcopacy
Gosnell was elected Coadjutor Bishop of West Texas at a Special Meeting of the Council convened at St Mark's Church on May 1, 1968. He was then consecrated bishop on September 11, 1968 at the San Antonio Convention Center by Presiding Bishop John E. Hines. He succeeded as diocesan bishop on December 31, 1968, and remain in office until his retirement on March 1, 1977. He then was co-chair of Venture in Mission. He died on July 18, 1999 at his home in San Antonio, a day after his 91st birthday.

References

1999 deaths
1908 births
20th-century American Episcopalians
Episcopal bishops of West Texas
20th-century American clergy
Syracuse University alumni
World War II chaplains